Barbara Jay (born 14 August 1937) is a British jazz singer.

Barbara Jay grew up in a musical family, her father playing trumpet with many of the leading bands of the time. She took naturally to singing and by the 1960s she was working with top British Jazz musicians including Ronnie Scott and Don Lusher.

As a solo Jazz singer Jay has shared the billing at Ronnie Scott's club with Horace Silver, Pharoah Sanders, George Chisholm and Dave Holland. More recently she has worked with Jon Hendricks in Cabaret on the Saga Ruby Cruise ship and P&O Oriana.

In 1970 she was chosen to sing with Benny Goodman and his orchestra on an extensive European tour and appeared in many major cities, including Paris, Milan, Copenhagen and Zurich.  She also performed at the Carnegie Tavern in New York where she was accompanied by Ellis Larkins.  In 1993 she devised the very successful "Ella Fitzgerald Songbook Show" which has been performed at major venues and Festivals throughout Britain and also with her own quartet at the Pizza on the Park Knightstbridge, London.  She appeared frequently with her saxophonist husband Tommy Whittle (he died in October 2013) and has performed extensively on British television and radio. She has also appeared at many European festivals including Nice and Cork. In December 2012, she appeared as a contributor to the BBC Four TV documentary  “Len Goodman’s Dancing Feet: the British Ballroom Story” describing her experiences singing for dance bands in the 1950s.

Discography
 The Nearness of You (Tee-Jay, 1982)
 Memories of You (Tee-Jay, 1988)
 Just Friends (Spotlite, 1997)
 The Ella Fitzgerald Songbook Revisited (Spotlite, 2000)
 Reminiscing with Barbara Jay (Spotlite, 2003)

References

External links
 Barbara Jay at Allmusic
 Searchable BBC archive including jazz programs at  BBC Genome project

1937 births
Living people
British women jazz singers
Place of birth missing (living people)